A list of the published work of Paul Di Filippo, American author.

Novels
 
 
 
 
 
 
 
 
 
 
 
 
Will Keats series

Short fiction
Collections
 
 Destroy All Brains! (1996)
 Ribofunk (1996)
 Fractal Paisleys (1997)
 Lost Pages (1998)
 Strange Trades (2001)
 Neutrino Drag (2001)
 Little Doors (2002)
 Babylon Sisters (2002)
 The Emperor of Gondwanaland (2005)
 Shuteye for the Timebroker (2006)
 Plumage From Pegasus (2006)
 Harsh Oases (2009)
 After the Collapse (2011)
 WikiWorld (2013)
Short stories

 "Return to the Twentieth Century", 40k, ebook edition (English | Italian) (2011)
 "Waves and Smart Magma", 40k, ebook edition (English | Italian) (2011)

Comic books
 Top Ten: Beyond the Farthest Precinct (2005)
 Doc Samson (2006)

Non-fiction

Books
 How to Write Science Fiction, 40k, ebook edition (2011)
 Science Fiction: The 101 Best Novels 1985-2010, co-authored with Damien Broderick (2012)

Essays, reporting and other contributions
 "Guest Editorial" in Postscripts 1. (2007)

Review columns

Notes

Bibliographies by writer
Bibliographies of American writers
Science fiction bibliographies